Charles Marvin Jacobs (born September 16, 1971) is the chief executive officer of Delaware North's Boston Holdings, including the Boston Bruins. In 2009, Sports Business Journal named Jacobs to their "Forty Under 40" list. Jacobs is involved with multiple philanthropic organizations, including the Dana–Farber Cancer Institute, the Boston Children's Hospital, and the Boston Bruins Foundation, the latter of which he serves as President.

Early life and education
Jacobs is the son of Margaret and Jeremy Jacobs. He is the youngest of their six children. His father is the chairman of Delaware North.

Jacobs attended Boston College and graduated with a Bachelor of Arts in 1994. After graduation, he moved to California, working briefly with the Los Angeles Kings before joining Total Media Group as CEO and president. In February 1999, Jacobs married Kimberly Diane Warren. The couple has three children, two sons and one daughter.

Career

Delaware North
In 2002, Jacobs left California and returned to Boston to join the family business as Principal at Delaware North. He is involved in leading the company's global operations, and also oversees strategy relating to the family and company holdings in Boston - including TD Garden, the Boston Bruins, New England Sports Network, and the Boston Bruins Foundation.

On January 6, 2015, Delaware North chairman Jeremy Jacobs relinquished the title of CEO and named Charlie Jacobs CEO of Delaware North's Boston Holdings, including TD Garden, New England Sports Network (NESN), the Boston Bruins and strategic real estate holdings.

Boston Bruins
Since 2000, Jacobs has served the Bruins as Alternate Governor to the NHL Board of Governors. He has also served the team as Principal since 2002.

According to his Profile in Sports Business Journal, Jacobs' time at the helm of the Bruins has helped transform the organization into one that is much more "fan-friendly." It was also Jacobs who chose to hire both GM Peter Chiarelli and Vice-President Cam Neely at the conclusion of the 2005–2006 season, helping boost game attendance in the process.
 
Following the Bruins' Stanley Cup win in 2011, the team's players and management, including Jacobs, were invited to the White House to commemorate their victory.

In June 2013, it was revealed that Jacobs gave season tickets for life to Marge Bishop, a seventy-seven-year-old fan who had had season tickets since the time of the Nixon administration but was unable to renew her tickets in 2006 due to price increases. In 2004, Jacobs personally invited Bishop to join the organization's Season Ticket Advisory Board when she was first thinking about not renewing her tickets. She kept the tickets for two more seasons, before eventually deciding she no longer could. At this point, Jacobs gave her a backstage tour of the TD Garden arena and concluded the experience by providing her with a VIP pass good for any Bruins game.

Board memberships and charity
Both Jacobs and his wife have worked with the Dana Farber Cancer Institute, Boston Children's Hospital, Bridge Over Troubled Water, and the Cardinal Cushing School.

Jacobs also serves on the board of directors for Ellis Memorial & Eldridge House and the Board of Trustees for The New England Sports Museum.

Jacobs is the chairman and founder of the Boston Bruins Foundation, an organization that helps children living in the Boston area by providing grants to organizations that improve health, education, athletics, and community outreach for children. Following the Bruins' Stanley Cup victory in 2011, Jacobs brought the Cup to The Jimmy Fund Clinic to visit with children battling pediatric cancer.

Equestrianism
Jacobs is also an avid equestrian, having served on the United States Equestrian Team. His family shares his love for horses and show jumping, and took a trip together to Lake Placid weeks after winning the Stanley Cup. In July 2009, Jacobs and his brother Lou finished first and second, respectively, at the $75,000 stake Lake Placid Hermes Grand Prix.

Jacobs has emerged victorious at numerous national events, including competitions in Florida, Michigan, Massachusetts, New York, New Hampshire, and Vermont. In both 2011 and 2012, Jacobs won the Summer Showcase Grand Prix, hosted at Fieldstone Show Park in Halifax, Massachusetts. He won both the Mar-a-Lago Club Grand Prix and the Ruby et Violette WEF Challenge Cup at the FTI Consulting Winter Equestrian Festival (FTI WEF) in January 2013. Jacobs also competed in the August 2013 Welcome Stake in Hampton Falls, New Hampshire, narrowly missing a first-place finish by just half a second.

Internationally, Jacobs traveled to the CSIO-W Buenos Aires event with the United States Show Jumping Team in both 2011 and 2012, competing in the FEI Nations Cup. In 2011, the team finished fifth overall and Jacobs won three events, including the Ericsson Grand Prix and the Nissan International Speed Derby. In 2012, the team won first prize in the Nations Cup, beating out Canada and Argentina (who tied for second). Jacobs repeated his victory in the International Speed Derby, and also finished fifth in the World Cup Qualifying Grand Prix.  In June 2013, Jacobs placed third in the Spruce Meadows "National" tournament in Calgary, Alberta. He was also named first alternate for the June 2013 Nation's Cup event at Spruce Meadows' Continental tournament.

Jacobs completed the 2011 Show Jumping Hall of Fame Jumper Classic Series in first place in the East Conference's Amateur-Owner Division. He finished the series with 645 points.

Jacobs won the 2013 $50,000 Holiday & Horses Wellington Qualifier in Wellington, Florida, receiving the $50,000 grand prize. Jacobs competed on his horse Flaming Star. The event was held from November 30 to December 1, 2013.

References

1971 births
Living people
American people of Polish-Jewish descent
Businesspeople from Buffalo, New York
Boston Bruins executives
Boston College alumni